In Mandaeism, Anush (also spelled Ennosh) or Anush Uthra is an uthra (angel or guardian) from the World of Light. Anush is considered to be the Mandaean equivalent of Enos.

Prayers in the Qolasta frequently contain the recurring formula "In the name of Hibil, Šitil, and Anuš".

The Mshunia Kushta is considered to be the shkina (dwelling) of Anush Uthra.

Overview
According to the Mandaean scriptures, including the Qolastā, the Book of John and Genzā Rabbā, Enosh is cognate with the angelic soteriological figure Anush Uthra, (sometimes translated as "Excellent Ennosh"), who is spoken of as the son or brother of Sheetil (Seth). Anush is a lightworld being (uthra) who taught John the Baptist and performed many of the same miracles within Jerusalem typically ascribed to Jesus by Christians.

See also
 List of angels in theology

References

Uthras
Hebrew Bible people in Mandaeism
Mandaean given names
Individual angels